Fabián Basualdo (born 26 February 1964 in Rosario, Santa Fe) is a retired Argentine football defender who played for a number of clubs in Argentina and the Argentina national football team.

Basualdo started his career with Newell's Old Boys in 1982 and remains 5th on the all-time appearances list for the club with 300 appearances. He also helped the team to win the 1987–88 league title.

After the successful league campaign of 1987–88 he was signed by Argentine giants River Plate where he won a further 3 league titles.

In 1991 Basualdo was part of the triumphant Argentina squad that won the Copa América.

In 1993 Basualdo rejoined Newell's where he played until 1996. He then moved down a division where he played for Godoy Cruz, Almirante Brown and Club Atlético Platense before he retired in 2000.

Honours

Club
 Newell's Old Boys
Primera Division Argentina: 1987–88

 River Plate
Primera Division Argentina: 1989–90, Apertura 1991, Apertura 1993

International
 Argentina
Copa América: 1991, 1993
FIFA Confederations Cup: 1992

References

External links

Official Twitter

1964 births
Living people
Footballers from Rosario, Santa Fe
Argentine footballers
Argentina youth international footballers
Argentina under-20 international footballers
Argentina international footballers
1991 Copa América players
1992 King Fahd Cup players
1993 Copa América players
Copa América-winning players
FIFA Confederations Cup-winning players
Association football defenders
Newell's Old Boys footballers
Club Atlético River Plate footballers
Godoy Cruz Antonio Tomba footballers
Club Atlético Platense footballers
Argentine Primera División players
Pan American Games bronze medalists for Argentina
Medalists at the 1987 Pan American Games
Footballers at the 1987 Pan American Games
Pan American Games medalists in football